Leptodeuterocopus sorongensis is a moth of the family Pterophoridae that is known from Papua New Guinea.

Adults are on wing in March.

External links
Insects of Papua New Guinea

Deuterocopinae
Moths described in 2006
Endemic fauna of Papua New Guinea